Hans H. Olson (July 23, 1847 – 1912) was a Norwegian-born American politician who served as a member of the Wisconsin State Assembly from 1896 to 1898.

Background
Olson was born on July 23, 1847, near Skien, Norway. In June 1857, he moved to Ashippun, Wisconsin before moving to Waushara County, Wisconsin in 1861 and to Berlin, Wisconsin in 1880. Olson worked in lumbering, school teaching and hotel keeping.

Olson represented Green Lake County, Wisconsin in the Wisconsin Assembly during the 1897 session. Olson also served as the clerk of the Berlin, Wisconsin board of education from 1890 to 1893. He was a Republican.

References

External links

Politicians from Skien
Norwegian emigrants to the United States
People from Ashippun, Wisconsin
People from Berlin, Wisconsin
School board members in Wisconsin
Schoolteachers from Wisconsin
1847 births
1912 deaths
Republican Party members of the Wisconsin State Assembly